Chris Barrett is a Gaelic footballer who plays for Clontarf and, formerly, for the Mayo county team. He previously played for the Belmullet club in Mayo before moving to Dublin.

He started at left corner back in the 2013 All-Ireland final where Mayo lost by a point to Dublin.

He received his first all star at the 2017 All Star Awards, when he was named at right corner back.

He studied at NUI Galway.

Barrett announced his retirement from inter-county in January 2021.

References

External links
Mayo GAA Profile

Living people
Alumni of the University of Galway
Clontarf Gaelic footballers
Gaelic football backs
Irish civil engineers
Mayo inter-county Gaelic footballers
People from Castlebar
1987 births